Barton in Fabis is a village and civil parish in the Rushcliffe district of Nottinghamshire.  It has a population of about 250, being measured at 266 in the 2011 Census. The village is just south of Nottingham, being on the other side of the River Trent from Attenborough.

A ferry, Barton Ferry, used to cross the River Trent to the Attenborough side near to the mouth of the River Erewash. A ferry crossed the River Trent at this point since before 1774.

The name originates from an older name, "Barton in the Beans" (Fabis being Latin for 'bean', in the ablative plural), apparently referring to the beans grown in the village.  This name was also used for a Leicestershire village, Barton in the Beans, which has retained its name.

See also
Listed buildings in Barton in Fabis

References

External links
 
 

Villages in Nottinghamshire
Rushcliffe